Route 29 may refer to:

Route 29 (MTA Maryland), a bus route in Baltimore, Maryland
London Buses route 29
SEPTA Route 29, a current bus route and former streetcar and trolleybus line in South Philadelphia.

See also
List of highways numbered 29

29